Persatuan Sepakbola Mamuju Utara (simply known as PS Matra) is an Indonesian football club based in Pasangkayu Regency, West Sulawesi. They currently compete in the Liga 3.

Honours
 Liga 3 West Sulawesi
 Champion: 2017
 Runner-up: 2016

References

External links

Football clubs in Indonesia
Football clubs in West Sulawesi
Association football clubs established in 2004
2004 establishments in Indonesia